The Aero-propulsion Systems Test Facility, located at Arnold Engineering Development Complex is a unique national facility designed to test aircraft propulsion systems in true mission environments without leaving the ground.  The test unit is owned by the United States Air Force and operated by National Aerospace Solutions.

History 
The need for an advanced ground-based, propulsion test facility was identified by a joint NASA and Department of Defense Aeronautics and Astronautics Coordinating Board in the 1960s. The Aero-propulsion Systems Test Facility was specifically designed for testing integrated, full-scale propulsion systems under simulated flight conditions. Construction begun in 1977 and took seven years to complete. Following integration and activation, the facility reached initial operational capability in September 1985.

Capabilities 
The Facility can simulate altitudes up to 75,000 feet, at speeds up to Mach 2.3, for engines rated up to 100,000 pounds of thrust. The air supply compressors can provide up to 1,500 pounds of air per second into the test cell to simulate airspeeds up to 1,800 miles per hour. The compressors, totaling 215,000 horsepower, are started by one of the largest variable frequency starting systems in the world.  An additional 960 pounds per second of airflow is also available by drawing outside air directly into the C-2 test cell.

Inlet air to the tested propulsion systems can be conditioned up to 450 degrees Fahrenheit by large combustion air heaters. These heaters can burn either diesel fuel or waste aviation fuel and generate up to 1,000,000,000 BTU per hour. Exhaust gases are cooled by direct-contact water spray, which reduces the temperature to 200 degrees Fahrenheit. Additional water spray cools and cleans the exhaust gas to less than 150 degrees Fahrenheit before it enters the exhaust compressors.

See also 
Arnold Air Force Base
Jet Engine

References

External links
Arnold Engineering Development Center (official)

Research installations of the United States Air Force
Propulsion
Military in Tennessee